Raymond "Bubba" Ventrone (born October 21, 1982) is a former American football safety and coach who is the assistant head coach and special teams coordinator for the Cleveland Browns of the National Football League (NFL). He was signed by the Patriots as an undrafted free agent in 2005. He played college football at Villanova.

“Bubba” Ventrone was also a member of the New York Jets, Cleveland Browns, and San Francisco 49ers. After a ten-year career as a player, Ventrone joined the Patriots coaching staff as assistant coach - special teams in March 2015, and was announced as the special teams coach of the Colts on February 15, 2018.

Early years
Ventrone received the nickname "Bubba" from his father as a child. As a seventh grader, Ventrone and two of his friends founded the Nathan S. Arenson Fund for Pancreatic Cancer Research, which supports research into pancreatic cancer at the University of Pittsburgh.

Ventrone attended Chartiers Valley High School in Bridgeville, Pennsylvania where he played football and holds records in track and field. He was a three-time All-Conference player and a Second-team All-State as a senior.

Ventrone has a younger brother, Ross Ventrone, who in 2010 signed as an undrafted free agent with the Patriots. He last played for the Pittsburgh Steelers in 2016.

College career
Ventrone began his college career at Villanova University in 2001. As a junior in 2003, Ventrone was selected to the All-Atlantic 10 Conference first-team. He finished his college career with 251 tackles, two sacks, and five forced fumbles. At Villanova, he was the hard-hitting safety who was often barred from making contact during practices to avoid injuring his teammates.

Professional career

New England Patriots
Although the Patriots considered picking Ventrone with the final pick of the 2005 NFL Draft, they chose tight end Andy Stokes as "Mr. Irrelevant"; Ventrone then signed as an undrafted free agent. Ventrone was released at the end of training camp and re-signed to the practice squad. After spending the rest of the 2005 season on the practice squad, he was allocated to NFL Europa in the spring of 2006. There, Ventrone suffered an injury and was placed on the team's NFL Europe/Non-Football Injury list, sidelining him for the 2006 season.

New York Jets
After the Patriots released Ventrone on February 13, 2007, he signed with the New York Jets on February 21; then-Jets head coach Eric Mangini had been Ventrone's defensive coordinator with the Patriots in 2005. After the Jets released Ventrone in their final cutdown before the 2007 season, they signed him to their practice squad, but released him on September 12.

New England Patriots (second stint)

The Patriots signed Ventrone to their practice squad on September 18, 2007 and then promoted to the team's 53-man roster on November 3. Upon the activation of Eddie Jackson and Chad Jackson from the PUP list, the Patriots released Ventrone on November 7, 2007, and re-signed him to their practice squad two days later. He was again promoted to the active roster in December, and remained on the active roster for the balance of the season, including Super Bowl XLII, in which he recorded his first NFL tackle.

During the 2008 offseason, Ventrone began practicing as a wide receiver, a position he had not played in games since he was a sophomore at Chartiers Valley High School; he had, however, previously lined up at wide receiver on scout teams in Patriots practices. In the Patriots' third 2008 preseason game, Ventrone led all receivers with four receptions, while still playing on special teams and defense. Ventrone would go on to play in 15 games during the 2008 season, almost exclusively on special teams, recording six special teams tackles.

During a July 31, 2009, press conference, Patriots head coach Bill Belichick spoke of Ventrone:

Despite those comments, however, the Patriots released Ventrone during their final cutdowns on September 5, 2009.

Cleveland Browns
Ventrone signed with the Cleveland Browns on September 16, 2009. He was re-signed to a three-year, $2.2 million deal on March 6, 2010.  Ventrone was selected as a Pro Bowl Alternate as a Special Teamer in 2010 where he led the #1 ranked special teams unit in the NFL. He was Special Teams Captain in 2011 and 2012.

San Francisco 49ers
Ventrone signed with the San Francisco 49ers on June 3, 2013, and served as a special teams captain for the 2013 and 2014 seasons; he was voted "Special Teams Player of the Year" by his teammates and coaches.

Coaching career

New England Patriots
On March 3, 2015, the New England Patriots announced that they had hired Ray Ventrone as a special teams assistant coach. He fills the vacancy left after Scott O'Brien retired as Patriots' special teams coach, and assistant Joe Judge was named as O'Brien's replacement. His hire ended the Patriots' status as the only NFL team without a former player on its coaching staff. On February 5, 2017, Ventrone was part of the Patriots coaching staff that won Super Bowl LI. In the game, the Patriots defeated the Atlanta Falcons by a score of 34–28 in overtime.

Indianapolis Colts
On February 15, 2018, Ventrone was hired as the special teams coach of the Indianapolis Colts.

Cleveland Browns
On February 24, 2023, the Cleveland Browns officially announced Ventrone as their new assistant head coach and special teams coordinator.

References

External links

New England Patriots bio

1982 births
Living people
Players of American football from Pittsburgh
American football safeties
American football wide receivers
Villanova Wildcats football players
New England Patriots players
Cologne Centurions (NFL Europe) players
New York Jets players
Cleveland Browns players
San Francisco 49ers players
New England Patriots coaches
Indianapolis Colts coaches
Cleveland Browns coaches